The Khowar alphabet is the right-to-left alphabet used for the Khowar language. It is a modification of the Urdu alphabet, which is itself a derivative of the Persian alphabet and Arabic alphabet and uses the calligraphic Nastaʿlīq script.

History 

The Khowar language developed during the rule of Mehtar of Chitral State. Since the early twentieth century Khowar has been written in the Khowar alphabet, which is based on the Urdu alphabet and uses the Nasta'liq script. Prior to that, the language was carried on through oral tradition. Today Urdu and English are the official languages and the only major literary usage of Khowar is in both poetry and prose composition. Khowar has also been occasionally written in a version of the Roman script called Roman Khowar since the 1960s. Despite the invention of the Khowar typewriter in 1996, Khowar newsletters and newspapers continued to be published from handwritten scripts by the Khowar authors until the late 1990s. The Monthly Zhang is the first newsletter was the first Khowar newspaper to use Nasta’liq computer-based composition. There are efforts under way to develop more sophisticated and user-friendly Khowar support on computers and the internet. Nowadays, nearly all Khowar newspapers, magazines, journals, and periodicals are composed on computers via various Khowar software programs.

Nasta'liq 

The Nasta'liq calligraphic writing style began as a Persian mixture of scripts Naskh and Ta'liq. Nasta'liq is more cursive and flowing than its Naskh counterpart.

Alphabet 

A list of the letters of the Khowar alphabet and their pronunciation is given below. Khowar contains many historical spellings from Arabic and Persian, and therefore has many irregularities. The Arabic letters yaa and haa both have two variants in Khowar: one of the yaa variants is used at the ends of words for the sound , and one of the haa variants is used to indicate the aspirated and breathy voiced consonants. The retroflex consonants needed to be added as well; this was accomplished by placing a superscript  (to'e) above the corresponding dental consonants. Several letters which represent distinct consonants in Arabic are conflated in Persian, and this has carried over to Khowar.   Some of the original Arabic letters are not used in Khowar.
This is the list of the Khowar letters, giving the consonant pronunciation.  Many of these letters also represent vowel sounds.

Vowels 

Vowels in Khowar are represented by letters that are also considered consonants. Many vowel sounds can be represented by one letter.  Confusion can arise, but context is usually enough to figure out the correct sound.

Vowel chart 

This is a list of Khowar vowels found in the initial, medial, and final positions.

Short vowels 

Short vowels ("a", "i", "u") are represented by marks above and below a consonant.

Alif 

Alif (ا) is the first letter of the Khowar alphabet, and it is used exclusively as a vowel.  At the beginning of a word, alif can be used to represent any of the short vowels, e.g. ابدار abdar, اسم ism, اردو Urdu. Also at the beginning, an alif (ا) followed by either wā'o (و) or ye (ی) represents a long vowel sound. However, wā'o (و) or ye (ی) alone at the beginning represents a consonant.

Alif also has a variant, call alif madd (آ).  It is used to represent a long "ā" at the beginning of a word, e.g. آپک āpak, آدیمزاد ādmzaad.  At the middle or end of a word, long ā is represented simply by alif (ا), e.g. باغ bāgh, آرام ārām.

Wā'o 

Wā'o is used to render the vowels "ū", "o", and "au". It also renders the consonants "w" and 'v', but many people get confused between these two sounds.

Ye 

Ye is divided into two variants: choṭī ye and baṛī ye.

Choṭī ye (ی) is written in all forms exactly as in Persian. It is used for the long vowel "ī" and the consonant "y".

Baṛī ye (ے) is used to render the vowels "e" and "ai" ( and  respectively). Baṛī ye is distinguished in writing from choṭī ye only when it comes at the end of a word.

Use of specific letters

Retroflex letters
Retroflex consonants were not present in the Persian alphabet, and therefore had to be created specifically for Khowar. This was accomplished by placing a superscript ط (to'e) above the corresponding dental consonants.

Do chashmī he 

The letter do chashmī he (ھ) is used in native Hindustānī words, for aspiration and breathy voice. The consonants are sometimes classified as separate letters, although they are digraphs.

References 

Khowar language
Arabic alphabets for South Asian languages